Da Hong Pao (Big Red Robe, 大紅袍) is a Wuyi rock tea grown in the Wuyi Mountains of Fujian Province, China. Da Hong Pao has a unique orchid fragrance and a long-lasting sweet aftertaste. Dry Da Hong Pao has a shape like tightly knotted ropes or slightly twisted strips, and is green and brown in color. After brewing, the tea is orange-yellow, bright and clear. Da Hong Pao can retain its flavor for nine steepings. The tea is often known to be extremely expensive.

Brew 
A traditional way to brew Da Hong Pao is by using a Purple Clay Teapot and  water. Purified water is considered by some the best choice to brew Da Hong Pao. The boiled water should be used immediately after boiling. Boiling the water for a long time or storing it for a long time after boiling will influence the taste of the Da Hong Pao. The third and fourth steeping are considered by some to have the best taste.

Production 
There are seven steps needed to make Da Hong Pao.

  (picking): Da Hong Pao is picked once a year, generally in May and June. The standard for fresh leaf picking is 1 bud with 2—3 leaves. 
  (withering): The picked tea leaves are spread evenly in the sun, using sunlight and breeze to evaporate the water.
  (cooling): After withering, the tea leaves are moved inside and cooled down.
  (making): The tea leaves are shaken and rolled in a big bamboo sieve. This may be conducive to the oxidation of polyphenols inside the tea leaves. This step is the most crucial part to form the fragrance, taste and rhyme of Da Hong Pao. And it is also the most complicated and time-consuming step.
  (stir-fry): There are two types of stir-fry, hand stir-fry and mechanical stir-fry leaves.
  (kneading): There are two types of kneading, hand kneading and mechanical kneading. By kneading, rolling, twisting, the tea leaves will form a cord shape.
  (baking): This step includes put the tea in a big basket and using different temperature to heat and dry the leaves, which usually takes hours.

Health benefits 
Da Hong Pao contains caffeine, theophylline, tea polyphenols, and flavonoids. For these reasons and others, a number of health benefits are claimed for the tea. Drinking Da Hong Pao could mitigate weariness and help blood circulation. And it could also treat edema and water retention. Moreover, it helps decrease the bad effects of drinking and smoking. The elements contained in Da Hong Pao could reduce the alcohol and nicotine. Furthermore, it has cosmetic effects. Drinking Da Hong Pao regularly is good for the skin and helps lose weight. Lastly, it helps relieving cough and reducing phlegm.

Price and value 
The best Da Hong Pao are from the mother Da Hong Pao tea trees. Mother Da Hong Pao tea trees have thousand years of history. There are only 6 mother trees remaining on the stiff cliff of Jiulongyu (Wuyi Mountains), which is considered a rare treasure. Because of its scarcity and superior tea quality, Da Hong Pao is known as the "King of Tea”.   In 2006, the Wuyi city government insured these 6 mother trees with a value of 100 million RMB. In the same year, the Wuyi city government also decided to prohibit anyone from privately collecting teas from the mother Da Hong Pao tea trees.  One of the last batch of Da Hong Pao harvested and made from the mother trees has been collected in the Palace Museum in Beijing. 20g of Da Hong Pao tea from one of the mother plants was sold for ¥208,000 in 2005, it is the highest auction record for Da Hong Pao.

The majority of Da Hong Pao on the market now are from artificially bred through the asexually produced, which maintained the characteristics of the Da Hong Pao. It is much cheaper than Da Hong Pao from the mother tea trees. The price depends heavily on its quality.

Origin of the name 
There are many stories about the origin of Da Hong Pao's name. The most famous one is that a long time ago, there was a scholar who was very sick on his way to Beijing for an exam. A monk of Tianxin Temple found him and brewed a bowl of tea picked from Wuyi Mountain for the scholar. After drinking the tea, the scholar felt much better and energetic. Few days later, he won the first place in the exam. So he came back to the temple to thank the monk who saved him. Later, he also uses this tea to cure the emperor's illness. The emperor rewarded the scholar with a red robe and asked the scholar to put the red robe on the tea tree. The red robe was considered a high honor at that time. The emperor also gave orders that all officials passing through this place must put their red robes on the tea trees to show the emperor's gratitude for his healing. After that, the tea trees were named Big Red Robe which in Chinese pronunciation is Da Hong Pao.

Trivia 

 In the Qing dynasty, Da Hong Pao often ranked first in the local tea trade competitions and won the title of "King of the tea." Local people were required to worship Da Hong Pao using animals, flowers and fruits before picking the tea leaves every year.
 During the Republic of China, the price of a pound of Da Hong Pao could buy 5000 pounds of rice or ten buffaloes.
 After the People's Republic of China was established, the procedures of making Da Hong Pao were especially strict. Every worker involved in picking or making the tea went through political vetting. After checking and ensuring the quality, the Da Hong Pao was sent to Beijing and received by Mao Zedong.
 When President of the United States Richard Nixon visited China in 1972, Mao Zedong gifted him 200g of Da Hong Pao, which represented peace and friendship between China and the United States.

See also 
 List of Chinese teas

References

Further reading 
 

Wuyi tea
Chinese teas
Chinese tea grown in Fujian
Cultivars of tea grown in China